Jimmie Williams, known professionally as Redaric Williams, is an American actor, model, author and musician. As an actor, he is best known for his role as Tyler Michaelson on the U.S. daytime drama, The Young and the Restless.

Personal life
Redaric Williams was born in Petoskey and raised in Detroit. He has four older sisters, a twin sister, as well as a younger sister and a younger brother. Frequently moving as a youth, he attended three different high schools before graduating from Denby High School in Detroit Williams attended the University of North Texas as a student athlete for UNT's NCAA Division One football team, also running track and field. He majored in business but developed a passion for performing as a result of taking drama and theater courses throughout his years in school. He eventually left college to pursue a career in acting. He was given the nickname "Red" due to his skin tone.

Career
Redaric began acting at the age of 11 on a Canadian children's TV series. After leaving college, Redaric relocated to New York City where he began professional training as an actor doing theater and independent films while working night shifts as a bouncer, doorman, and bartender at various New York City nightclubs. Though he initially opposed the idea, Redaric finally started modeling after receiving multiple modeling job offers. After several successful brand campaigns, he quickly became the face of Carling Black Label based in South Africa. At this time, Redaric decided to recommit himself to acting and he signed on for the role of Tyler Michaelson on The Young and the Restless. He revealed that when he registered with the Screen Actors Guild (SAG), the name, Jimmie Williams was already being used, so he chose to go by Redaric Williams.

While living in New York, Williams founded a social media company with two other friends.

Filmography

Awards and nominations

References

External links

1981 births
Living people
Male actors from Detroit
African-American male actors
American male soap opera actors
Male actors from New York City
Male models from Michigan
People from Petoskey, Michigan
21st-century African-American people
20th-century African-American people